Over 1400 Indus Valley civilisation sites have been discovered, of which 925 sites are in India and 475 sites in Pakistan, while some sites in Afghanistan are believed to be trading colonies. Only 40 sites on the Indus valley were discovered in the pre-Partition era by archaeologists in British India, around 1,100 (80%) sites are located on the plains between the rivers Ganges and Indus. The oldest site of Indus Valley Civilization, Bhirrana and the largest site, Rakhigarhi, are located in the Indian state of Haryana. More than 90% of the inscribed objects and seals that were discovered were found at ancient urban centres along the Indus river in Pakistan, mainly Harappa (Punjab) and Mohenjo-daro (Sindh). More than 50 IVC burial sites have been found, main sites among those are Rakhigarhi (first site with genetic testing), Sanauli, Farmana, Kalibangan, Lothal, Dholavira, Mehrgarh, Harappa, Chanhudaro, and Mohenjo-daro.

List of Indus Valley sites discovered 
This table lists Indus Valley civilisation discoveries.

Context of IVC sites and cultures 

Wider context of the IVC includes the following:

 Meluhha
 Indus–Mesopotamia relations 
 Conflict with the Akkadians and Neo-Sumerians
 List of inventions and discoveries of the Indus Valley Civilization
 Hydraulic engineering of the Indus Valley Civilization
 Sanitation of the Indus Valley civilisation
 Periodisation of the Indus Valley civilisation
 Pottery in the Indian subcontinent
 Bara culture, subtype of Late-Harappan Phase
 Cemetery H culture (2000-1400 BC), early Indo-Aryan pottery at IVC sites later evolved into Painted Grey Ware culture of Vedic period
 Black and red ware, belonging to neolithic and Early-Harappan phases
 Sothi-Siswal culture, subtype of Early-Harappan Phase

See also

 Timeline of Indian history
 List of archaeological sites by country
 List of archaeological sites by continent and age
 World Heritage Sites by country

References

Bibliography 

 

 
Archaeological sites in Asia
Archaeological sites in India
Archaeological sites in Pakistan
Archaeological sites in Afghanistan
Indus Valley Civilisation sites
Punjab
Archaeological sites in Haryana
Archaeological sites in Sindh